Ivor Davies (26 April 1906 – 3 November 1963) was a Welsh rugby union, and professional rugby league footballer who played in the 1920s and 1930s.

Background
Ivor Davies died in Halifax, West Riding of Yorkshire, England.

Playing career

International honours
Ivor Davies was a Great Britain (RL) tourist in 1932. However, although he played in tour matches, he didn't play in the test matches.

Challenge Cup Final appearances
Ivor Davies played , and scored a try in Halifax's 22-8 victory over York in the 1930–31 Challenge Cup Final during the 1930–31 season at Wembley Stadium, London on Saturday 2 May 1931, in front of a crowd of 40,368.

Genealogical information
Ivor Davies' marriage to Gladys I. (née Bottomley) was registered during first ¼ 1933 in Halifax district. They had children; Megan Davies (birth registered fourth ¼ 1933 in Halifax district).

References

External links
!Great Britain Statistics at englandrl.co.uk (statistics currently missing due to not having appeared for both Great Britain, and England)
Search for "Davies" at rugbyleagueproject.org
Profile at blackandambers.co.uk
The Halifax Rugby League team celebrating their win over York in the Challenge Cup Final at Wembley Stadium London 1/2
The Halifax Rugby League team celebrating their win over York in the Challenge Cup Final at Wembley Stadium London 2/2

1906 births
1963 deaths
Great Britain national rugby league team players
Halifax R.L.F.C. players
Newport RFC players
Place of birth missing
Rugby league five-eighths
Rugby league players from Newport, Wales
Rugby union players from Newport, Wales
Rugby union fly-halves
Welsh rugby league players
Welsh rugby union players